Mohammed Lashaf (born 7 October 1967) is a retired Moroccan football midfielder.

References

1967 births
Living people
Moroccan footballers
Royal Antwerp F.C. players
Racing Jet Wavre players
Standard Liège players
FC Gueugnon players
Association football midfielders
Moroccan expatriate footballers
Expatriate footballers in France
Moroccan expatriate sportspeople in France
Expatriate footballers in Belgium
Moroccan expatriate sportspeople in Belgium
Ligue 1 players
Belgian Pro League players
Morocco international footballers